The 1897 Argentine Primera División was the 6th season of top-flight football in Argentina.  The championship was won by Lomas that achieved its 4th Argentine league title in 5 seasons. Lomas won the title after beating Lanús A.C. by 1-0 in a 3rd playoff match.

The players of Lomas Academy (dissolved one year before) returned to its parent club, Lomas Athletic, while Lanús A.C., Banfield and Palermo A.C. made their debuts and Belgrano A.C. registered a "B" team to play the tournament.

Final standings

Championship final 

After both teams, Lomas and Lanús finished in the first position, they had to play a final to decide a champion. It finished 1–1 after extra time so a playoff was held four days later. As that match ended 0–0 with no modifications on the score during extra time, a second game was scheduled for September 19. The result was also a tie.

Finally, Lomas defeated Lanús 1–0 in the third match, becoming Primera División champion.

Playoff

Playoff 2

Playoff 3

Notes

References

Argentine Primera División seasons
1897 in Argentine football
1897 in South American football
m